Gilbert Askey (March 9, 1925 – April 9, 2014) was an American jazz trumpeter, composer, producer and musical director who was born in Austin, Texas, and emigrated to Australia in 1988.

Personal life
Askey was born in Austin, Texas, on March 9, 1925, but left at the age of 17. He completed two years of university on a medical scholarship.

In 1980, he married an Australian woman whom he had first met in 1973 and the couple moved to Melbourne, Australia in 1988.

Career
Askey was considered to be "one of the architects of the legendary Motown sound". Berry Gordy often called Askey "The glue that kept everything together".

Askey studied music at the Boston Conservatory of Music and the Harnett School of Music in New York.

He performed with jazz musicians including Dizzy Gillespie, Miles Davis, Duke Ellington and Count Basie, and even did a duet with Billie Holiday. He worked as a musical director for many acts such as Diana Ross, both with and without The Supremes, the Four Tops, The Temptations, Stevie Wonder, The Jackson 5, Gladys Knight, Keni Burke and Linda Clifford.

Askey played as a jazz trumpeter for almost 25 years before arriving at Motown Records to work as a musical director, producer, songwriter and musical arranger for such artists as Billy Eckstine, Gladys Knight, The Temptations, The Supremes, Martha Reeves and The Vandellas, Marvin Gaye and Stevie Wonder, The Jackson 5 and The Funk Brothers. Askey was also part of Motown's Artists Development crew that included Maxine Powell, Maurice King, Cholly Atkins and Harvey Fuqua.

When Diana Ross became a solo performer, she hired Askey to be her Musical Director. He worked with her for 10 years and wrote the score for her first motion picture Lady Sings the Blues that earned him an Academy Awards nomination in 1972. In the mid and late 1970s, Askey worked with Curtis Mayfield, writing and arranging for his Curtom Record Company on recordings by Linda Clifford, The Jones Girls and Mayfield himself. When things got out hand during a show in Antwerp, Belgium, that starred the Four Tops, Askey leaped on the stage and played trumpet amazingly until the audience calmed down. Askey was the arranger and conductor for The Supremes during their successful runs at the Copa nightclub in New York. He pretty much put the whole show together.

After moving to Australia in 1988, Askey returned to performing in 1993, and continued to perform right up to his death from lymphoma in Melbourne on April 9, 2014.

In Melbourne, Askey taught and mentored young aspiring musicians. He also toured and played many regular gigs and jazz spots around the country until his death.

Discography

Arranger, trumpet - Freddie McCoy Lonely Avenue - 1965
 Arranger, Band Leader, Conductor - The Supremes at the Copa - 1965
 Arranger - Diana Ross & the Supremes Sing and Perform "Funny Girl" - 1968
 Arranger, Conductor, Musical Direction - Diana Ross and the Supremes "Farewell" - 1970
 Conductor - Diana Ross "Lady Sings the Blues Soundtrack" - 1972

References

External links

 (ABC Arts Online)
 on RocKwiz episode 134 on August 18, 2012 (SBS OnDemand; about 23 minutes into the episode)
Gil Askey performing at St. Kilda on 5th of January 2014 - photos

1925 births
2014 deaths
Musicians from Austin, Texas
Boston Conservatory at Berklee alumni
Motown
American jazz trumpeters
American male trumpeters
American music arrangers
American conductors (music)
American male conductors (music)
American emigrants to Australia
Deaths from lymphoma
Deaths from cancer in Victoria (Australia)
American jazz composers
American male jazz composers
Jazz musicians from Texas
Classical musicians from Texas
African-American film score composers